The "OPlatz" (Oranienplatz) movement was a pro-immigration protest movement that worked for an open-arms policy in the admission of migrants and refugees into Germany and in specific opposition to the third Dublin agreement, Residenzpflicht, "Lagers" or refugee camps and for the refugee’s right to work and study in Germany. From October 2012 to April 2014 the group maintained a protest encampment in the Oranienplatz plaza in Kreuzberg, Berlin. The "OPlatz" movement was composed mostly of African asylum applicants, who had come from camps all over Germany in an act of civil disobedience against theResidenzpflicht. Groups active in the organisation included Women In Exile, International Women Space and the Voice Refugee Forum. After the autonomous clearing of the camp in 2014 and in face of the rejection of most refugee applications, the group remains active and raises awareness for their cause through their webpage and information point at the Oranienplatz.

Arrival in Berlin and early demonstrations in 2012 

After the suicide of Iranian refugee Mohammed Rahsapar in a refugee camp in Würzburg, numerous refugees in that camp came together and marched in protest towards Berlin in 2012. In about a month, they covered 600 km from Würzburg to Berlin, in which they had passed other "Lagers" where they invited others to join them. This march was intended to raise awareness against the Residenzpflicht, a legal requirement that lasts 6 months in Germany that prohibits the locational movement of applicants to refugee status (Asylbewerber) or that of those who have been granted the temporary permit to stay (Geduldete). Upon their arrival in Oktober of 2012 they set up camp in the Oranienplatz without requesting formal permission before. The district of Kreuzberg and its mayor, Franz Schulz (Green Party), temporarily allowed the occupation of the Oranienplatz.

On 24 October, a group of 40 refugees starts a hunger strike in front of the Brandenburger Tor. 2 days later, the police deprives the group of their sleeping pads and bags. The group continues their strike, but is forced on 2 November to abandon their cause. Shortly afterwards, on 8 November, the "OPlatz" movement and its members occupy the Gerhart-Hauptmann-Schule. Franz Schulz announced that the inhabitation of the School would be allowed for a few days. On 11 November, the district’s administration allows the refugees to temporarily stay in the school until the end of March 2013.

Demonstrations in the following year 
From 26 February to 20 March 2013, a "Refugee’s Revolution" bus tours 22 cities in Germany and attempts to unify similar movements and demonstrations on a national scale. On 23 March, about a thousand protesters march from the Oranienplatz into downtown Berlin. They protest for the "Refugee’s Revolution" and remind Berlin that they are still there at the Oranienplatz. On 13 July, the refugee group obstaculates a nearby NPD rally that tried to raise awareness against the refugees. In the same month, the refugee camp came under scrutiny for allegations of rape. The police investigated these allegations, but they remain unproven.

On 9 August, Senator Frank Henkel (CDU) attempts to circumvent the district’s administration and tries to have the camp cleared. He does not succeed, but he sparks a continuous political discussion, which would not terminate for months.

After the Lampedusa tragedy on 3 October in 2013, in which 300 refugees died traveling from Africa to the Lampedusa isle, about 20 OPlatz protesters peacefully occupied the foyer of the EU-commission in Berlin on 10 October. The protesters, some of which had come to the EU through Lampedusa, brought candles to commemorate the dead and requested to speak with a government representative. The police allowed the protest to peacefully continue into the afternoon, after which the protesters moved onwards to an evening demonstration at the German chancellery. Also, on 9 October, 23 protesters went into hunger strike in front of the Brandenburger Tor again. They preferred to define themselves with the English term "non-citizens" and continued their strike until 19 October, after which they ensured that they would continue their strike in January 2014, had the political agenda regarding refugees not changed by then. During the 10-day hunger and thirst strike about 40 people were hospitalized, many of whom directly rejoined the strike after treatment.

On 24 November, OPlatz representatives and local politicians reached an agreement for the refugees to move from the Oranienplatz to the retirement home Zum Guten Hirten in Berlin-Wedding. Additionally, an information point shall remain at Oranienplatz, to increase awareness for a new Asylpolitik. On the same day, after 80 refugees had moved into their new home, the police attempted to clear Oranienplatz of the remaining refugees. Over 600 people protested that evening, in order for the refugees to be allowed to stay since the retirement home was at full capacity. Due to the continued occupancy of the tents, the police postponed the clearing of the square until further notice. During the protests, the police made a few arrests and warranted the use of pepper spray. Shortly afterwards, Senator Frank Henkel announces an ultimatum: on 18 January 2014, the remaining refugees and tents will be cleared.

2014 and the clearance of the Oranienplatz 
A little before the ultimatum’s expiration date, on 7 January, Berlin’s executive mayor Klaus Wowereit strived to find an alternative for the refugees. He cancelled the ultimatum and declares Berlin a city open to refugees, even in the face of the growing numbers, although he will not permit any more occupations.

On 18 March 2014, Senator Dilek Kolat presented a solution. Under the condition that the refugees left the Oranienplatz, the Senate would provide them with housing, German language education and with the individual inspection of each and every one of their cases. From a list of 467 people, the majority agreed to the terms. A minority group of 30 people with more complicated cases, rejected the offer though. Famously among them was Napuli Langa, a south Sudanese woman who in protest to the evacuation of Oranienplatz refused to descend a tree for five days. Parallel to her protest, other refugees continued to hunger strike  in the north end of the Oranienplatz, several days after its clearance. By the ides of April the town square had been declared clear again.

The Gerhart-Hauptmann-Schule continued to remain inhabited. On 23 June, the Senate notifies the inhabitants that other housing has been made available. 160 of the 200 residents are escorted and evacuated by 1700 policemen, in attempt to prevent re-inhabitation of the school. The remaining 40 refuse to leave, and some occupy the roof, threatening to throw themselves down and to burn down the building if the school is forcefully intruded. After nine days, an agreement was reached that mandated that the refugees could stay as long as they did not allow any more to join them. In August 2016, the last 12 inhabitants received a notice of eviction.

Effectiveness and Continuation of the OPlatz Movement 
While many, if not all, of the refugee status applicants were rejected, the movement and its treatise with the Berlin senate continue to encourage refugees all around Europe during these difficult times for them. The movement contributed in the decision to shorten the Residenzpflicht’s locational travel lock from 6 months to 3 months. In 2013, on 1 July, one of the Bundesländer, Thüringen, redefined the locational lock to be effective to the extense of its borders. Since then all other federal states in Germany, with the exception of Bavaria and Sachsen, have done the same.

In 2015, German chancellor Angela Merkel announced Germany’s support of Hungary with the refugee crisis and vowed to take over a million refugees in. This was a response to the significant influx of asylum applicants that Europe experienced due to the Syrian civil war.

The OPlatz movement continues to organise events up until today and continues to speak out against the Residenzpflicht, while also advocating an alternative asylum political agenda and the diversity of refugees, not only Syrians.

The refugee run newspaper Daily Resistance which was setup at O-Platz was still operating in 2016. Groups involved include the Voice Refugee Forum, Women in Exile, and Street Roots.

References

Politics of Ireland